Edward Vincent Toms (28 July 1872 – 10 August 1953) was an Australian rules footballer who played with South Melbourne in the Victorian Football League (VFL).

Notes

External links 

1872 births
1953 deaths
Australian rules footballers from Victoria (Australia)
Sydney Swans players